Synthetiklezmer was the first EP release by the Mexican music producer and recording artist Sotelúm. Released during hanukkah 2011, this material is an experimental fusion between sephardic fanfare sounds and klezmer with drum machines and synthesizers, the EP counted with the special collaboration of Gustavo Bulgach, Argentine-American clarinetist and bandleader of Klezmer Juice and Yiddish Tango Club.

References

2011 EPs
The Klezmatics albums
Albums produced by Sotelúm
Electronic dance music EPs